Stemmatophora perrubralis is a species of snout moth in the genus Stemmatophora. It was described by George Hampson in 1917. It is found in Nigeria and South Africa.

References

Moths described in 1917
Pyralini
Moths of Africa